Kedi is a 2006 Indian Tamil-language romantic crime thriller film written and directed by Jyothi Krishna. Starring Ravi Krishna, Ileana D'Cruz, and Tamannaah, the film marks the Tamil debut of D'Cruz and Tamannaah, where the latter plays a character with negative shades and the former plays love interest of Ravi Krishna whilst Ramesh Khanna, Atul Kulkarni, Adithya, M. S. Baskar and Suman Setty played supporting roles in the film. The film was released on 24 September 2006 and was a commercial success.

Plot

Raghu is a happy-go-lucky young man who is not serious about studies or life. He has a great time in college playing pranks with fellow students. His father dotes on him and so do his close friends. A new girl Priyanka joins his class, and she is the sister of Pughazhenthy, a powerful gangster-turned-minister. Priyanka lives a privileged life, and the college gets a facelift as her classroom is fitted with an AC, and the canteen gets a hip look.

Priyanka even manages to change the principal using her brother's influence, and she dislikes Raghu. Aarthi, a maid's daughter, studies in the same class, and she has a secret admiration towards Raghu. Seeing the way in which Priyanka treats him, Aarthi gives moral support and motivates Raghu to come above Priyanka, who is an all-rounder and best student in the university. This infuriates Priyanka who slowly wants him at any cost. Aarthi is blackmailed by a boy who takes her vulgar photos and he saves her from it. Priyanka decides to separate them, and creates photos with him.

Priyanka finally realises Raghu's love towards Aarthi, and she tries everything possible to separate them but Pughazhenthy wants Raghu to marry his sister. He angers Aarthi by kidnapping and electrifying her, yet she turns normal on seeing Raghu, but worsens when she sees him getting shot. In the end, Aarthi goes mental, which enrages Raghu, who vows revenge on Priyanka. He pretends to accept the marriage and marries Aarthi at the last minute. Raghu discovers that Priyanka even murdered her brother in order to live with Raghu. The film ends with Priyanka killing herself and Raghu burying Aarthi's chain at Priyanka's grave.

Cast

Ravi Krishna as Raghu
Tamannaah as Priyanka (voice dubbed by Suchitra)
Ileana D'Cruz as Aarthi (voice dubbed by Savitha Reddy)
Atul Kulkarni as Pughazhenthy
Suman Setty as Raghu's friend
Nalla Venu as Raghu's friend
M. S. Bhaskar as Raghu's father
Adithya as Aadhi
Ramesh Khanna as Shop Assistant
Chitti Babu as Politician
Sudha as Aarthi's mother

Soundtrack
After working with A. R. Rahman in his previous project Enakku 20 Unakku 18, Jyothi Krishna decided to work together with Yuvan Shankar Raja in this film. The soundtrack, released on 9 June 2006, consists of 8 tracks with lyrics written by Pa. Vijay, whilst director Perarasu and Kabilan wrote lyrics for each one song. Deva's brother Sabesh had sung one of the songs. Yuvan Shankar Raja would go on to reuse some of the background music in his next venture Billa.

References

External links 
 

2000s romantic thriller films
2000s Tamil-language films
2006 crime thriller films
2006 films
Films directed by Jyothi Krishna (director)
Indian crime thriller films
Indian romantic thriller films
Romantic crime films